is a Japanese footballer who plays as defensive midfielder for  club Nagoya Grampus.

National team career
In August 2007, Yonemoto was elected Japan U-17 national team for 2007 U-17 World Cup. He played 2 matches.

Yonemoto made his full international debut for Japan on 6 January 2010 in a 2011 AFC Asian Cup qualifier against Yemen.

On 7 May 2015, Japan's coach Vahid Halilhodžić called him for a two-days training camp. On 23 July 2015, he was called again for the upcoming 2015 EAFF East Asian Cup.

Career statistics

Club
.

Reserves performance

Last Updated: 21 February 2019

National team statistics

Honors
 FC Tokyo
 J2 League: 2011
 J.League Cup: 2009
Individual
 J.League Cup MVP: 2009
 J. League Cup New Hero Award: 2009

References

External links

 
 Japan National Football Team Database
 
 Profile at FC Tokyo
 

1990 births
Living people
Association football people from Hyōgo Prefecture
Japanese footballers
Japan youth international footballers
Japan international footballers
J1 League players
J2 League players
J3 League players
FC Tokyo players
FC Tokyo U-23 players
Nagoya Grampus players
Shonan Bellmare players
Association football midfielders